An Phú is an urban municipality (thị trấn thuộc huyện) and capital town of the An Phú District of An Giang Province, Vietnam. It is connected to Phnom Penh in Cambodia via the National Road 21.

Communes of An Giang province
Populated places in An Giang province
District capitals in Vietnam
Townships in Vietnam